"Stretcher Case Baby" is a limited edition single by English punk rock band The Damned, released on 3 July 1977 by Stiff Records.

Only 5,000 copies were distributed, none via record shops. Copies were initially given away at the band's London Marquee Club first anniversary concerts, but when these were cut short, further copies were given to fan club members, and 250 were given as crossword prizes via New Musical Express. The new tracks were cut with American record producer Shel Talmy, marking the band's first real steps away from the traditional punk ethos. "Stretcher Case Baby" was re-recorded for the band's second album, Music for Pleasure, under the shortened title "Stretcher Case".

A CD version was issued in the Stiff Singles 1976-1977 box set by Castle Music in 2003.

Track listing
 "Stretcher Case Baby" (Scabies, James) - 2:16
 "Sick of Being Sick" (James)  - 1:59

Production credits
 Producers:
 Shel Talmy
 Musicians:
 Dave Vanian − vocals
 Brian James − guitar
 Captain Sensible − bass		
 Rat Scabies − drums

External links

1977 singles
The Damned (band) songs
Song recordings produced by Shel Talmy
Songs written by Brian James (guitarist)
Songs written by Rat Scabies
1977 songs
Stiff Records singles